Roberto Girometti is an Italian film director and cinematographer.

Girometti is known for such films as The Iron Hand of the Mafia, Ratman and The Incinerator.

References

External links

Living people
Italian cinematographers
Italian film directors
Giallo film directors
Artists from Rome
1939 births